Enrique Guerrero Salom (born 28 August 1948) is a Spanish politician who served as a Member of the European Parliament from 2009 until 2019, representing Spain for the Spanish Socialist Workers Party. From 2012 until 2014 he served as Vice-Chair of the Progressive Alliance of Socialists and Democrats group in the European Parliament. Between 1993 and 1996 he served as Secretary of State for Relations with the Cortes.

References

Living people
1948 births
MEPs for Spain 2009–2014
MEPs for Spain 2014–2019
Spanish Socialist Workers' Party MEPs
Fulbright alumni